The Headless Children is the fourth studio album by heavy metal band W.A.S.P., released in April 1989 through Capitol Records. The album reached No. 48 on the US Billboard 200 chart, the band's highest chart position, and remained on that chart for 13 weeks. This was the last album W.A.S.P. released before their temporary breakup in 1990, only to reunite two years later for The Crimson Idol (1992).

Overview

The Headless Children showcases a new level of maturity from the band compared to their previous three albums, which had stereotypically lewd "rock and roll" lyrics. Politics and social issues are now a theme throughout the album. The cover art, based on "Gateway to Stalingrad", a cartoon by Daniel R. Fitzpatrick, depicts a string of historical figures including Joseph Stalin, Adolf Hitler, Heinrich Himmler, Benito Mussolini, Charles Manson, Jim Jones, Idi Amin, Pol Pot, Al Capone and the Ku Klux Klan, with an image of Jack Ruby shooting Lee Harvey Oswald shown prominently in the foreground. Later editions of the album have replaced, among others, Ayatollah Khomeini with additional KKK members.

The Headless Children was the first W.A.S.P. album to feature ex-Quiet Riot drummer Frankie Banali and the last studio album to feature guitarist Chris Holmes for six years until he rejoined the band in late 1995 to record Kill Fuck Die. This is also the band's last album to feature bassist Johnny Rod. In 1990, following departures of Holmes and Rod, W.A.S.P. decided to call it quits, but resurfaced about a year later, with only lead singer/bassist Blackie Lawless and Banali remaining; this was because their next album, The Crimson Idol, was originally intended to be a solo album by Lawless, until he agreed to release it under the W.A.S.P. name.

"The Real Me" is one of two songs the band covered and released as part of the Headless Children release, (the other being "Locomotive Breath", by Jethro Tull, which was the b-side of the single "Mean Man"). "The Real Me" however was the only song of the two to make the album. The song was written by Pete Townshend of The Who's and is from their classic rock opera album, Quadrophenia.

"Mean Man", written by Lawless, is about guitarist Chris Holmes' wild lifestyle and is dedicated to him.

Lawless stated in an interview shortly after the release of the album, that "The Neutron Bomber", is about Ronald Reagan and the power he and America had over the world, with such a large nuclear arsenal. The song despite most likely being written during his presidency, was however released a few months after his retirement and the election of George H. W. Bush.  Alternatively, in an interview entitled "Headhunter" published in the May/June 1989 edition of Metal Forces magazine, Lawless said the song "is about a guy named Ronny who I grew up with over in Staten Island who was the biggest mass fire starter in the history of the Northeast! And Ronny is somewhere right now where he's never ever gonna start fires again. Concrete and steel don't burn. Heh heh. He's in for triple life, you know?"

"Forever Free" is a ballad typical of the time in the hard rock/heavy metal genre, which is supposedly a homage to Lynyrd Skynyrd's "Free Bird".

According to the liner notes, the "F.D.G." in "Rebel in the F.D.G." stands for "Fucking Decadent Generation".

Critical reception

In a contemporary review for the German magazine Rock Hard, Thomas Kupfer considered The Headless Children second only to W.A.S.P. "brilliant debut album" and remarked how the song structures were simpler and the music more melodic than in previous works, but Lawless' voice had "lost nothing of its charisma".

More recently, Greg Prato at AllMusic called The Headless Children W.A.S.P.'s "most accomplished work" and their "best constructed album". He also noted "The Real Me", "Mean Man", "The Heretic", "Forever Free" and the title track as highlights. Canadian journalist Martin Popoff described the album as "the W.A.S.P. record for those who don't like W.A.S.P., hollow, damp and alone, integrity discovered, humanity revealed."

Track listing

 – On the 1998 reissue, "The Heretic (The Lost Child)" has been edited to remove a small portion of a guitar riff in order to fit all the bonus material on the same CD.

Personnel
W.A.S.P.
Blackie Lawless – lead vocals, rhythm guitar, production
Chris Holmes – lead guitar, acoustic guitar
Johnny Rod – bass guitar, backing vocals

Additional musicians
Frankie Banali – drums, percussion
Ken Hensley – keyboards
Diana Fennell, Lita Ford, Mark Humphreys, Jimi Image, Minka Kelly, Thomas Nellen, Cathi Paige, Mike Solan, Kevin Wallace, Melba Wallace, Ron Wallace – backing vocals on "Thunderhead"

Production
Mikey Davis – engineer, mixing
Tom Nellen – assistant engineer
Rhonda Schoen – editing engineer
Andy Taylor – manager
Rod Smallwood – manager
John Kosh – art direction
Steve Hall – mastering at Future Disc
George Marino – mastering at Sterling Sound, New York

Charts

Album

Singles

Certifications

References

W.A.S.P. albums
1989 albums
Capitol Records albums
Albums produced by Blackie Lawless